SS Will Rogers was a Liberty ship built in the United States during World War II. She was named after Will Rogers, an American stage and film actor, vaudeville performer, cowboy, humorist, newspaper columnist, and social commentator from Oklahoma.

Construction
Will Rogers was laid down on 11 October 1942, under a Maritime Commission (MARCOM) contract, MCE hull 923, by the Bethlehem-Fairfield Shipyard, Baltimore, Maryland; she was sponsored by Betty Rogers, the widow of Will Rogers, and was launched on 11 November 1942.

History
She was allocated to Merchant & Miners Transportation, Co., on 27 November 1942.

She was struck on the starboard side in the #1 hold, which caused flooding in the hold and the forepeak. Will Rogers was then taken in tow and beached off of Holyhead, near , which had also been torpedoed by U-1024 on 7 April. The two ships were refloated on 23 April, and towed to Liverpool, for repairs. Will Rogers returned to service on 1 December 1945.

On 12 April 1948, she was first laid up in the National Defense Reserve Fleet, Beaumont, Texas. On 21 December 1949, she was returned to the National Defense Reserve Fleet, Beaumont, Texas. On 9 April 1952, she was laid up in National Defense Reserve Fleet, Mobile, Alabama. On 12 March 1971, she was sold for scrapping to Pinto Island Metals Co., for $41,400. She was removed from the fleet on 25 March 1971.

References

Bibliography

 
 
 
 
 

 

Liberty ships
Ships built in Baltimore
1942 ships
Beaumont Reserve Fleet
Mobile Reserve Fleet
Ships attacked by German U-boats